Yang Yuting (1887–1982) was a teacher of Wu-style t'ai chi ch'uan. He was Wang Maozhai's primary disciple and studied with him from 1916 to 1940.

Biography
He began training in martial arts from the age of nine. He had a number of masters and learned Tan Tui, changquan, xingyiquan, baguazhang and Wu-style t'ai chi ch'uan.

He reformed his Wu-style training to make it more systematic and standardised the Wu-style t'ai chi he had learned from Wang Maozhai. After his death he became the leader of the Wu-style Beijing group.

He was a respected teacher in Beijing for 75 years and at the time of his death vice-chairman of Beijing Martial Arts Association (北京市武术运动协会副主席), a highly prestigious position within Beijing martial art community. Wang Pei-sheng, Li Jing-wu and Li Bing-ci were all his students.

Wu-style was created by a Manchurian named Wu Ch'uan-yu (1834–1902). Wu was a student of Yang Luchan, (founder of the Yang style), and Yang Pan-hou. Wu Ch'uan-yu’s son, Wu Chien-ch'uan (1870–1942), loved martial arts from his youth and studied under the tutorship of his father. After 1912 he continuously developed the teaching Tai Chi Chuan at the Beijing Sport Research Society, gradually refining his father’s style.

T'ai chi ch'uan lineage tree with Wu-style focus

References

 

Chinese tai chi practitioners
1887 births
1982 deaths